James or Jim Houghton may refer to:

 Jim Houghton (born 1948), American actor and writer
 Jim Houghton (politician) (1911–1985), member of the Queensland Legislative Assembly
 Jim Houghton (footballer) (1891–1973), Australian rules footballer
 James R. Houghton (born 1936), Chairman of the Board of Corning Incorporated
 James Houghton (artistic director) (1958–2016), American educator, mentor, and arts administrator